The Pentamerus Bjerge Formation is a geologic formation part of the Peary Land Group in Greenland. It preserves fossils dating back to the Silurian period.

The formation is named after the Pentamerus Range (Pentamerus Bjerge) in Daugaard-Jensen Land, NW Greenland.

See also

 List of fossiliferous stratigraphic units in Greenland

References

 

Silurian Greenland
Silurian northern paleotropical deposits